"Love Love" is a 2010 single release by Scottish recording artist Amy Macdonald, released as the fourth single from her second studio album, A Curious Thing (2010).

Background 
Macdonald's single comes as part of an EP recorded live at Metropolis Studios. She recorded four tracks for 'On track...with SEAT' earlier in 2010 including her single "Love Love", the hit "This Is the Life", "Don't Tell Me That It's Over" and her cover of Bruce Springsteen's "Dancing in the Dark". The music video was released on 23 September 2010.

Track listing 
Digital download (Metropolis 'On Track' Session EP)
 "Love Love" (Metropolis 'On Track Session) – 3:09
 "This Is the Life" (Metropolis 'On Track Session) – 3:20
 "Dancing in the Dark" (Metropolis 'On Track Session) – 3:10
 "Don't Tell Me That It's Over" (Metropolis 'On Track Session) – 3:16

Promo CD single
 "Love Love" – 3:17

Chart performance

References

External links 
Love Love – lyrics & chords
Amy Macdonald – Amy Macdonald official site

2010 singles
Amy Macdonald songs
Songs written by Amy Macdonald
2009 songs
Mercury Records singles